East Legon is a town in the Accra Metropolitan district, a district of the Greater Accra Region of Ghana.

East Legon has a total area of 4.95 km2 (1.91 mi2) and a total distance of 9.36 km (5.82 mi). It is an 11-minute drive from the Kotoka International Airport and a 38-minute drive from the Tema Harbour. It has within its zoon one of the branches of the ICGC church's, The New Wine Temple formerly known as the Yehweh Temple headed by Rev. Dr. Ismaila Hans Awudu.

References

Populated places in the Greater Accra Region